The list of Olympic men's ice hockey players for Slovenia consisted of 26 skaters and 3 goaltenders. Men's ice hockey tournaments have been staged at the Olympic Games since 1920 (it was introduced at the 1920 Summer Olympics, and was permanently added to the Winter Olympic Games in 1924). Slovenia has participated in two tournaments, the first in 2014 and most recently in 2018, though from 1964 until 1984 they participated as part of Yugoslavia. Slovenia's best finish has been seventh place, at the 2014 Winter Olympics. 

Eighteen players were in both Olympic tournaments Slovenia has participated in, while eleven have played in all nine games Slovenia played. Jan Muršak has scored the most goals, 4, assists, 5, and point, 9, for Slovenia at the Olympics.



Key

Goaltenders

Skaters

Notes

References

 
 
 
 
 
 

ice hockey
Slovenia
Slovenia